Ali is a 2001 American biographical sports drama film co-written, produced and directed by Michael Mann. The film focuses on ten years in the life of the boxer Muhammad Ali, played by Will Smith, from 1964 to 1974, featuring his capture of the heavyweight title from Sonny Liston, his conversion to Islam, criticism of the Vietnam War, and banishment from boxing, his return to fight Joe Frazier in 1971, and, finally, his reclaiming the title from George Foreman in the Rumble in the Jungle fight of 1974. It also touches on the great social and political upheaval in the United States following the assassinations of Malcolm X and Martin Luther King Jr.

The project began in 1992 when producer Paul Ardaji optioned the movie rights to Muhammad Ali’s life story. In 1992, Ardaji had visited Ali on his 50th birthday and persuaded him to allow a film to be made about his life. Nearing the end of his option period, Ardaji signed a contract with Sony Pictures, joining forces with producer Jon Peters as producing partner. In February 2000, it was announced that Mann had taken over as a director, following his Academy Award nomination for The Insider. Filming began in Los Angeles on January 11, 2001 on a $105 million budget, shooting took place in New York City, Chicago, Miami, and Mozambique.

The film was well-received by critics, but was a box-office bomb. Will Smith and Jon Voight received Academy Award nominations for Best Actor and Best Supporting Actor, respectively.

Plot
The film begins with Cassius Clay Jr. before his championship debut against the heavyweight champion Sonny Liston. Clay taunts Liston, then dominates the early rounds of the match. Halfway through, he complains of a burning feeling in his eyes (implying that Liston has tried to cheat) and says he is unable to continue. His trainer/manager Angelo Dundee gets him to keep fighting. Once Clay is able to see again, he dominates the fight and Liston quits before round seven, making Clay the second-youngest heavyweight champion at the time after Floyd Patterson.

Clay spends time with Malcolm X and is invited to the home of Nation of Islam leader Elijah Muhammad, where he is given the name Muhammad Ali. His father, Cassius Clay Sr., disapproves. Ali marries Sonji Roi, an ex-Playboy Bunny, although she is not Muslim and does not abide sex segregation. Ali goes to Africa and meets up with Malcolm X, but later refuses to speak to him, honoring the wishes of Elijah Muhammad. He is distraught over Assassination of Malcolm X.

Upon returning to America, Ali fights Sonny Liston a second time and knocks him out in the first round. He and Sonji divorce after she objects to various obligations Muslim women have.

Ali refuses conscription for the Vietnam War and is stripped of his boxing license, passport and title, and sentenced to five years in prison. Ali marries 17-year-old Belinda Boyd. After a three-year hiatus, his conviction is overturned in Clay v. United States and in his comeback fight, he goes against Jerry Quarry and wins by technical knockout in three rounds. Ali attempts to regain the heavyweight championship against Joe Frazier. In the "Fight of the Century", Frazier generally has the upper hand against Ali and wins by decision, the first loss of Ali's career. Frazier later loses the championship to George Foreman.

Foreman and Ali go to Kinshasa, Zaire, for the Rumble in the Jungle fight. There, Ali meets Veronica Porché and has an affair with her. After reading rumors of his infidelity in newspapers, his wife Belinda travels to Zaire to confront him. Ali says he is unsure whether he loves Veronica, but is focused solely on his upcoming title shot.

For a good portion of the fight against Foreman, Ali leans back against the ropes (Rope-a-dope) allowing Foreman to tire himself out. He then knocks out the exhausted Foreman, regaining the Heavyweight Championship.

Cast
 Will Smith as Cassius Clay Jr. / Cassius X / Muhammad Ali
 Jamie Foxx as Drew Bundini Brown - Ali's assistant trainer
 Jon Voight as Howard Cosell - A journalist
 Mario Van Peebles as Malcolm X - Ali's friend, and a civil rights leader
 Ron Silver as Angelo Dundee - Ali's trainer
 Jeffrey Wright as Howard Bingham - Ali's photographer
 Michael Bentt as Sonny Liston - The boxing champion at the beginning of the movie
  Robert Sale as Jerry Quarry - One of Ali's opponents
 James Toney as Joe Frazier - One of Ali's opponents
 Charles Shufford as George Foreman - One of Ali's opponents
 Mykelti Williamson as Don King - A promoter who arranged Ali's fight against Foreman
 Jada Pinkett Smith as Sonji Roi - An ex-Playboy bunny
 Nona Gaye as Belinda Boyd / Khalilah Ali - A woman who interviewed Ali as a child
 Michael Michele as Veronica Porché - A woman who worked with Don King
 Joe Morton as Chauncey Eskridge - Ali's lawyer
 Paul Rodriguez as Dr. Ferdie Pacheco - Ali's doctor
 Bruce McGill as Bradley - A government agent
 Barry Shabaka Henley as Herbert Muhammad - Ali's manager, and the son of Elijah Muhammad
 Albert Hall as Elijah Muhammad - Leader of the Nation of Islam
 Giancarlo Esposito as Cassius Clay Sr. - Ali's father
  David Haines as Rudy Clay / Rahman Ali - Ali's brother
 Laurence Mason as Luis Sarria
 LeVar Burton as Martin Luther King Jr. - A civil rights leader
 David Cubitt as Robert Lipsyte - A journalist
 Leon Robinson as Brother Joe
 Ted Levine as Joe Smiley - A government agent
  Malick Bowens as Joseph Mobutu - The President of Zaire
 Victoria Dillard as Betty Shabazz - Malcolm X's wife
  David Elliott as Sam Cooke - A musician
 Brad Greenquist as Marlin Thomas

Production
The project began in 1992 when producer Paul Ardaji optioned the movie rights to Muhammad Ali's life story. In 1992, Ardaji had visited Ali on his 50th birthday and persuaded him to allow a film to be made about his life. Nearing the end of his option period, Ardaji signed a contract with Sony Pictures, joining forces with producer Jon Peters as producing partner. Producer Jon Peters started developing the film in 1994. Gregory Allen Howard wrote the initial draft of the script, which had the working title Power and Grace. Howard's draft focused on Ali's life from 12 to 40 years old, and his relationship with his father. Howard was replaced by writers Stephen J. Rivele and Chris Wilkinson, and by 1998 the biopic was set up at Columbia Pictures, with Will Smith attached to star and the possibility of Ron Howard directing. During the filming of Wild Wild West, Smith presented director Barry Sonnenfeld with the script. Columbia was hoping for filming to start towards the end of 1998, but it was pushed back, and Sonnenfeld exited in November 1999. It was speculated the Columbia was hesitant to move forward with Sonnenfeld following the disappointing box office performance of Wild Wild West. In February 2000, it was announced that Michael Mann had taken over as director, following his Academy Award nomination for The Insider. With this commitment to Ali, Mann turned down the opportunity to direct early versions of The Aviator, Shooter and Savages, and brought Eric Roth to co-write the script. After years of being attached to the Ali biopic, Smith officially signed on in May 2000 with a $20 million salary.

Filming began in Los Angeles on January 11, 2001 on a $105 million budget. Shooting also took place in New York City, Chicago, Miami and Mozambique.

Smith spent about one year learning about Ali's life. These included boxing training (up to seven hours a day), Islamic studies with Wiljah Akbar and dialect training. Smith has said that his portrayal of Ali is his proudest work to date.

One of the selling points of the film is the realism of the fight scenes. Smith worked alongside boxing promoter Guy Sharpe from SharpeShooter Entertainment, and his lead fighter Ross Kent, to get the majority of his boxing tips for the film. All of the boxers in the film are former or current world heavyweight championship caliber boxers. It was quickly decided that 'Hollywood fighting'—passing the fist (or foot) between the camera and the face to create the illusion of a hit—would not be used in favor of actual boxing. The only limitation placed upon the fighters was for Charles Shufford (who plays George Foreman). He was permitted to hit Smith as hard as he could, so long as he did not actually knock the actor out.

Smith had to gain weight to look the part of Muhammad Ali.

Reception

Box office 
Ali opened on December 25 (Christmas Day), 2001 and grossed a total of $14.7 million in 2,446 theaters during its opening weekend. The film went on to gross a total of $87.7 million worldwide.

Due to its high production and marketing costs, the film ended up losing Columbia Pictures as much as $100 million. The film’s failure was partly due to its competition with The Lord of the Rings: The Fellowship of the Ring.

Critical response 
On review aggregator website Rotten Tomatoes, the film holds an approval rating of 68% based on 156 reviews, with an average rating of 6.30/10. The site's critics consensus: "Though perhaps no film could fully do justice to the fascinating life and personality of Muhammad Ali, Mann's direction and Smith's performance combine to pack a solid punch." On Metacritic, the film has a weighted average score of 65 out of 100, based on 39 critics, indicating "generally favorable reviews". Audiences polled by CinemaScore gave the film an average grade of "B+" on an A+ to F scale.

Roger Ebert derided the film with two stars in his review for the Chicago Sun-Times, and mentioned, "it lacks much of the flash, fire and humor of Muhammad Ali and is shot more in the tone of a eulogy than a celebration". In Variety magazine, Todd McCarthy wrote, "The director's visual and aural dapplings are strikingly effective at their best, but over the long haul don't represent a satisfactory alternative to in-depth dramatic scenes; one longs, for example, for even one sequence in which Ali and Dundee discuss boxing strategy or assess an opponent", but he did have praise for the performances: "The cast is outstanding, from Smith, who carries the picture with consummate skill, and Voight, who is unrecognizable under all the makeup but nails Cosell's distinctive vocal cadences". USA Today gave the film two and half stars out of four and stated that, "for many Ali fans, the movie may be good enough, but some perspective is in order. The documentaries a.k.a. Cassius Clay and the Oscar-winning When We Were Kings cover a lot of the same ground and are consistently more engaging".

In The New York Times, Elvis Mitchell proclaimed Ali to be a "breakthrough" film for Mann, adding that it was his "first movie with feeling" and that "his overwhelming love of its subject will turn audiences into exuberant, thrilled fight crowds". J. Hoberman, in his review for the Village Voice, felt that the "first half percolates wonderfully—and the first half hour is even better than that. Mann opens with a thrilling montage that, spinning in and out of a nightclub performance by Sam Cooke, contextualizes the hero in his times", and concluded that, "Ali's astonishing personality is skillfully evoked but, in the end, remains a mystery".

When Ali died on June 3, 2016, Smith was chosen to be one of Ali's pallbearers for the memorial service in Louisville.

Awards and honors

Alternate versions
The film was released theatrically in 2001 at a length of 157 minutes. This version was released on DVD on April 30, 2002. Mann then re-edited the film, creating a new cut that ran 165 minutes and was released on DVD on June 1, 2004 as The Director's Cut. Approximately 4 minutes of theatrical footage was removed, while 14 minutes of previously unseen footage was placed back in by Mann. The Director's Cut also featured an audio commentary by Mann. The theatrical cut of the film was released on Blu-ray in France in 2009 and in Germany in 2012. In 2016 Mann created a third cut, significantly re-editing the film in the wake of Ali's death. He deleted one fight and added scenes and footage focusing on the political side of Ali's life. This version runs 152 minutes and was released on January 17, 2017 on Blu-Ray in the US as the Commemorative Edition.

References

External links
 
 
 
 
 Excerpts from production notes
 "Michael Mann and Will Smith in the Ring With Ali" New York Times article
 An interview with the film's cinematographer Emmanuel Lubezki

2001 films
2001 biographical drama films
2000s sports drama films
African-American biographical dramas
African-American films
American sports drama films
Columbia Pictures films
Films about Muhammad Ali
Films about race and ethnicity
Films directed by Michael Mann
Films produced by Michael Mann
Films produced by Jon Peters
Films set in Miami
Films set in New York City
Films set in the 1960s
Films set in the 1970s
Films set in the Democratic Republic of the Congo
Films shot in Mozambique
Initial Entertainment Group films
Overbrook Entertainment films
Films with screenplays by Michael Mann
Films with screenplays by Eric Roth
Sports films based on actual events
Cultural depictions of Muhammad Ali
Cultural depictions of Martin Luther King Jr.
Cultural depictions of Malcolm X
2001 drama films
Films about Islam
2000s English-language films
2000s American films